Alfred Atherton may refer to:
 Alfred Atherton (1921–2002), former U.S. Ambassador
 Alfred Bennison Atherton (1843–1921), Canadian physician